This list shows the roads in Switzerland named after a woman, order by canton and by city.

Geneva 
Among more than 500 streets named after a person, only 21 are named after a woman.

Neuchâtel

Vaud 
In Lausanne, only 3 streets are named after a woman, while 97,2% are named after a man.

Zürich

References 

Lists of women
Lists of Swiss women
Streets in Switzerland
Women
Switzerland
History of women in Switzerland